× Laeliocatonia is a nothogenus of intergeneric orchid hybrids descended from the parent genera Laelia, Cattleya and Broughtonia. It is abbreviated Lctna. in the horticultural trade.

References

Laeliinae
Orchid nothogenera